Hannah Eliza Goldschmidt (born May 18, 1992) is an American mixed martial artist who competes in the Flyweight division of the Ultimate Fighting Championship.

Background
Goldy grew up in Vermont snowboarding, running track, and competing in cross-country. In 2014, while living in Manhattan she went with her father to a boxing event called "Friday Night Fights", held in an old church. She immediately fell in love with martial arts and went to a gym the next day. Before MMA, she had a boxing match and three Muay Thai fights, winning all 4.

Mixed martial arts career

Early career
She made her professional debut against future UFC fighter Gillian Robertson at Island Fights 37 on March 11, 2016, winning the bout via unanimous decision. She would then go on to win her bout against Vanessa Marie Grimes via TKO in the second round at Island Fights 46. At Premier FC 26 she faced Lisa Blaine, defeating her via unanimous decision, followed by a bout against Shannon Goughary at Island Fights 50, which she won in similar fashion.

Goldy was invited onto Dana White's Contender Series 17 on June 18, 2019, where she faced Kali Robbins. She won the bout via unanimous decision, but wasn't offered a UFC contract.

Ultimate Fighting Championship
Goldy made her UFC debut at flyweight against Miranda Granger on August 3, 2019 at UFC on ESPN: Covington vs. Lawler. She lost the fight via unanimous decision.

Goldy was scheduled to face Loma Lookboonmee on February 23, 2020 at UFC Fight Night 168. However, Goldy pulled out due to a shoulder injury.

Goldy was scheduled to face Jessica Penne to take place on March 27, 2021 at UFC 260. However, Goldy pulled out of the fight on March 24, due to testing positive for COVID-19, and the bout was scrapped. The pairing was rescheduled to UFC on ESPN 22 on April 17, 2021. A week before the bout, Goldy pulled out of the event, and she was replaced by LFA Women's Strawweight champion Lupita Godinez.

Goldy faced Diana Belbiţă at UFC on ESPN: Sandhagen vs. Dillashaw on July 24, 2021. She lost the fight via unanimous decision.

Goldy, as a replacement for Cory McKenna, faced Emily Whitmire at UFC Fight Night: Smith vs. Spann on September 18, 2021. She won the fight via an armbar in round one.

Goldy was scheduled to face Jinh Yu Frey on February 26, 2022 at UFC Fight Night 202. On February 23, Goldy withdrew from the bout due to illness and the bout was cancelled.

Goldy faced Molly McCann on July 23, 2022, at UFC Fight Night 208. She lost the bout via TKO in the first round.

Personal life 
Goldy has a son, Odin (born 2017) with fellow mixed martial artist Alex Nicholson.

Mixed martial arts record 

| Loss
|align=center|6–3
|Molly McCann
|TKO (spinning back elbow and punches)
|UFC Fight Night: Blaydes vs. Aspinall 
|
|align=center|1
|align=center|3:52
|London, England
|-
| Win
| align=center|6–2
| Emily Whitmire
| Submission (armbar)
| UFC Fight Night: Smith vs. Spann
| 
| align=center| 1
| align=center| 4:17
| Las Vegas, Nevada, United States
| 
|-
|Loss
| align=center| 5–2
| Diana Belbiţă
|Decision (unanimous)
|UFC on ESPN: Sandhagen vs. Dillashaw 
|
|align=center|3
|align=center|5:00
|Las Vegas, Nevada, United States
|
|-
| Loss
| align=center| 5–1
|Miranda Granger
|Decision (unanimous)
|UFC on ESPN: Covington vs. Lawler 
|
|align=center|3
|align=center|5:00
|Newark, New Jersey, United States
|
|-
| Win
| align=center|5–0
|Kali Robbins
|Decision (unanimous)
| Dana White's Contender Series 17
| 
| align=center| 3
| align=center| 5:00
| Las Vegas, Nevada, United States
|
|-
| Win
| align=center| 4–0
| Shannon Goughary
|Decision (unanimous)
|Island Fights 50
|
|align=center|3
|align=center|5:00
|Pensacola, Florida, United States
|
|-
| Win
| align=center|3–0
| Lisa Blaine
|Decision (unanimous)
| Premier FC 26
|
|align=center|3
|align=center|5:00
|Springfield, Massachusetts, United States
|
|-
| Win
| align=center|2–0
| Vanessa Marie Grimes
|TKO (punches)
|Island Fights 46
|
| align=center|2
| align=center|2:39
|Pensacola, Florida, United States
|
|-
| Win
| align=center|1–0
|Gillian Robertson
|Decision (unanimous)
|Island Fights 37
|
|align=center| 3
|align=center| 5:00
|Pensacola, Florida, United States
| 
|-

See also 
 List of current UFC fighters
 List of female mixed martial artists

References

External links 
  
 

1992 births
Living people
American female mixed martial artists
Strawweight mixed martial artists
Mixed martial artists utilizing boxing
Mixed martial artists utilizing Muay Thai
Ultimate Fighting Championship female fighters
American women boxers
American Muay Thai practitioners
Female Muay Thai practitioners
21st-century American women